A. ehrenbergii may refer to:

 Anabasis ehrenbergii, a flowering plant
 Astragalus ehrenbergii, a terrestrial plant

See also

 A. ehrenbergi (disambiguation)